Marianówek may refer to the following places in Poland:
Marianówek, Lower Silesian Voivodeship (south-west Poland)
Marianówek, Łódź Voivodeship (central Poland)